Mora is a municipality in Évora District in Portugal. The population in 2011 was 4,978, in an area of 443.95 km2.

The present Mayor is Paula Cristina Calado Chuço, elected by the Socialist Party in 2021. The municipal holiday is Easter Monday.

Climate

Parishes
Administratively, the municipality is divided into 4 civil parishes (freguesias):
 Brotas
 Cabeção
 Mora
 Pavia

Gallery

Notable people 
 José Pedro Biléu (born 1932 in Mora) a former Portuguese footballer with 303 caps with Lusitano de Évora

References

External links
Town Hall official website
Online Newspaper
Photos of Mora

Municipalities of Évora District